Peter Hardy (11 January 1957 – 16 March 2023) was an Australian actor, theatre performer, and musician.

Early life and career
Hardy was born in Perth, Western Australia on 11 January 1957. He began his music career in 1969 playing the French horn in the CCGS Orchestra. Hardy began his career on stage on the show "Revue - The Other Opening". Later, he played and sang in "An Officer And A Gentleman" in the Lyric Theatre in Sydney under the direction of Simon Phillips.

Hardy began his film career in 1986 with The Pursuit of Happiness, after which he played in a number of films, TV movies, TV series and shorts. In 1996, Hardy appeared in the Network 10 series Sweat. Between 2006 and 2009 he appeared in 44 episodes of McLeod's Daughters as Phil Rakich. In 2012, Hardy appeared in a television film, Dangerous Remedy, as Robbie McGregor.

Death
Hardy died while snorkelling at South Beach in Fremantle, Western Australia, on 16 March 2023. He was 66.

Filmography

References

External links
 

1957 births
2023 deaths
20th-century Australian male actors
21st-century Australian male actors
Male actors from Perth, Western Australia
Australian male film actors
Australian male television actors
Deaths by drowning in Australia